James Roosevelt III (born November 9, 1945) is an American attorney, Democratic Party official, and a grandson of U.S. President Franklin D. Roosevelt and Eleanor Roosevelt.  As of 2021, he is the co-chair of the Rules and Bylaws Committee of the Democratic National Committee, a position he has held since 1995.

Early life
Roosevelt was born on November 9, 1945 to Representative James Roosevelt II (1907–1991) and Romelle Theresa Schneider (1915–2002). His two full siblings are Michael (born December 7, 1946) and Anna (born January 10, 1948). Through his father, he has two elder half-sisters (Sara and Kate), a younger half-brother (Hall), and a younger half-sister (Rebecca).  His paternal grandparents were President Franklin D. Roosevelt (1882–1945) and First Lady Eleanor Roosevelt (1884–1962).

Roosevelt graduated from La Salle High School in Pasadena in 1963. He earned his A.B. with honors in government from Harvard College in 1968, his J.D. from Harvard Law School in 1971 and later attended the six-week Advanced Management Program at Harvard Business School.

Career
On June 12, 1968, following his graduation from Harvard, he was commissioned in the Naval Reserve and rose to the rank of lieutenant on July 1, 1971.

After obtaining his J.D. from Harvard Law, Roosevelt spent 10 years as partner at Choate, Hall & Stewart in Boston, Massachusetts.  Roosevelt was the associate commissioner for Retirement Policy for the Social Security Administration before joining Tufts Health Plan in 1999 as senior vice president and general counsel. He held that position until June 2005, when he became President and Chief Executive Officer of Tufts Health Plan.

In 1986, he ran for Congress in Massachusetts 8th congressional district, losing the Democratic primary to Joseph P. Kennedy, II.

He has also served as chief legal counsel for the Massachusetts Democratic Party. He is past chairman of the board of trustees for the Massachusetts Hospital Association, past president of the American Health Lawyers Association and past chairman of the board of trustees for Mount Auburn Hospital. Currently, Roosevelt serves as chairman of the board of directors for Massachusetts Association of Health Plans, and as a member of the boards at America's Health Insurance Plans, Catholic Democrats, Emmanuel College, and the Kenneth B. Schwartz Center.

He was called upon in 2008 to oversee hearings on controversies related to seating delegates from Florida and Michigan to the 2008 Democratic National Convention. Roosevelt was described as "detail-oriented," and as having great "institutional knowledge." He had not publicly endorsed either Clinton or Obama before the committee meeting.

Personal life
On June 15, 1968, Roosevelt married Ann Martha Conlon. Together, they have three daughters:

 Kathleen Ann Roosevelt (born 1978), a Barnard College graduate who married Jeffrey Walker in 2007.
 Theresa Marie "Tracy" Roosevelt (born 1982), a Brown University graduate who married Robert O'Loughlin in 2016.
 Maura Amy Roosevelt (born 1984), a Harvard University graduate who married Joshua Fisher in 2014.

References

External links

1945 births
Living people
James
Livingston family
Schuyler family
Bulloch family
Delano family
American law firm executives
American people of Dutch descent
American people of English descent
American people of French descent
American people of Scottish descent
American people of Welsh descent
Harvard Law School alumni
Massachusetts Democrats
Massachusetts lawyers
Harvard College alumni